Napoli is an Italian surname. Notable people with the surname include:

 Aiman Napoli (born 1989), Italian footballer
 Alexander J. Napoli (1905–1972), a United States federal judge
 Donna Jo Napoli (b. 1948), author and linguist
 Emanuele Napoli, painter and restorer at the Royal Palace of Capodimonte in the reign of Ferdinand IV.
 Jacopo Napoli (1911–1994), Italian composer
 Jeanne Napoli (1938–2010), American singer and songwriter
 Mike Napoli (born 1981), Major League Baseball player with the Cleveland Indians.
 Nicola Napoli (1905–1982), founder of Artkino Pictures
 Nicolò Napoli (born 1962), Italian  footballer
 Rose Napoli, Canadian playwright and actor
 Tommaso Napoli (1659–1725), Italian architect
 William Napoli (b. 1948), state senator in South Dakota, United States
 Arturo Di Napoli (born 1974), Italian footballer
 Fernando De Napoli (born 1964), Italian footballer
 Gennaro Di Napoli (born 1968), Italian middle distance runner
 Patrick Esposito Di Napoli (1964–1994), Canadian musician
 Patrick de Napoli (born 1975), Swiss footballer
 Thomas DiNapoli (born 1954), American politician

Italian-language surnames
Italian toponymic surnames‎